Nom yen is a Thai drink made from sala syrup and cold milk. In Thai, nom means 'milk' and yen means 'cold'. There are two kind of milk for making nom yen. Nom sot is fresh milk, nom thammada is condensed milk, and nom khon wan is sweetened condensed milk. There are two styles of nom yen: iced and frappe ones. One can find it at almost everywhere in Thailand from vendors selling drinks on street. The price ranges from 15 THB (Thai baht) to 25 THB alone or from 30 to 60 THB at a café with some bakery. Thai people also make sweet from nom yen as well. The other style of nom yen can be found in street sweet shops. It's called namkhaeng sai or a Thai style frozen nom yen. The ingredients are similar to those of nom yen, except changing from iced into frozen one. Unlike nom yen, Thai people consider namkhaeng sai a homemade style sweet because it's easy to make and the ingredients can be found easily in local area.

References

Thai drinks